The Vancouver Nighthawks was a professional basketball franchise based in Vancouver, British Columbia, in 1988. The team played its inaugural season in the World Basketball League, which folded before the schedule ended.

The Nighthawks played its home games at the BC Place Stadium.

Sources
 Vancouver Nighthawks

Basketball teams in Vancouver
Defunct basketball teams in Canada
World Basketball League teams
1988 establishments in British Columbia
1988 disestablishments in British Columbia
Basketball teams established in 1988
Sports clubs disestablished in 1988